There have been over 200 rugby league footballers who have played for Queensland in State of Origin since its inception in 1980. All players who have been selected to debut for the Queensland in State of Origin matches have been assigned a number by the Queensland Rugby League. Arthur Beetson is first as he was the first captain. Players that debuted in the same game are capped by jumper number. Players are listed according to the date of their debut game.

List of players

Under-20s
The following is a list of players who have played for the Queensland under-20 team since the first game in 2012. Players who represent the under-20 team are not given a cap number, so they are listed alphabetically by the year they made their debut.

Women's
The following is a list of players who have played for the Queensland women's team since their first game in 1999. The following list has missing information as accurate records were not kept in the early years of the Women's Interstate Challenge by either the QRL or the NSWRL. In 2019, the QRL announced cap numbers for women's representatives.

See also

 List of New South Wales State of Origin players

References

External links
Player's Register
RLP List of Players

 
Queensland rugby league team players